Kazaj (also Romanized as Kazej; also known as Karaj) is a village in Khvoresh Rostam-e Shomali Rural District of Khvoresh Rostam District, Khalkhal County, Ardabil province. At the 2006 census, its population was 1,047 in 278 households. The following census in 2011 counted 799 people in 259 households. The latest census in 2016 showed a population of 820 people in 286 households; it was the largest village in its rural district.

References 

Khalkhal County

Towns and villages in Khalkhal County

Populated places in Ardabil Province

Populated places in Khalkhal County